The Bus Safety Act 2009 (also BSA) is a law enacted by the Parliament of the State of Victoria, Australia and is the prime statute regulating the safety of bus operations in Victoria. The Act was developed as part of the Transport Legislation Review conducted by the Department of Transport between 2004 and 2010 and is aimed at preventing deaths and injuries arising from bus operations in Victoria and establishes a modern "best practice" regulatory framework to assist in maintaining and improving the Victorian bus industry's good safety record.

The Act continued regulatory control over the operation of large buses and introduced safety standards for the small or mini-bus sector which comprises 40% of the Victorian bus fleet.  Controls over large and small buses comprise permissions such as accreditation and registration. In addition, the Act introduced broad based "safety duties" for bus operators and all others who have a significant role in providing both commercial and non-commercial bus services. The Act also extended the range of enforcement powers and sanctions available to the safety regulator - the Director, Transport Safety operating as Transport Safety Victoria - and operates to encourage greater safety awareness across all types of bus operations.

The Act was the State's first dedicated statute on the subject and replaced provisions in the Public Transport Competition Act 1995, which was renamed Bus Services Act 1995. The Bus Safety Act forms part of the transport policy and legislation framework in Victoria set by the Transport Integration Act 2010, and its provisions are subject to the overarching transport system vision, transport system objectives and decision making principles set out in that Act. The Bus Safety Act was passed in late March 2009 and commenced on 31 December 2010.

The responsible Minister for the Act is the Minister for Public Transport, currently Jacinta Allan.

Outline 
The stated purpose of the Bus Safety Act Act is "...to provide for the safe operation of bus services in Victoria". The objects of the Act center on the safety of bus operations, management of safety risks, continuous improvement in bus safety management, public confidence in the safety of bus transport, appropriate stakeholder involvement and the existence of a safety culture among bus service providers.

The Act also contains a number of overarching policy principles relating to shared responsibility for safety, accountability for managing safety risks, enforcement, transparency, consistency and stakeholder involvement.

.
The Act establishes a regulatory scheme with the following key elements -
  a number of performance-based safety duties which apply to the broad range of parties who can affect bus safety outcomes
 an accreditation scheme concentrating on key commercial bus industry operators and operators of local bus services
 a registration scheme for operators of small buses (mini buses) and large non commercial buses
 a broad range of sanctions and penalties
 cost benefit protections against excessive action by the regulator which affect industry participants
 alcohol and drug management controls on bus safety workers through a requirement for operators to develop and implement an alcohol and drug management policy
 provision for the making of codes of practice to provide guidance on compliance to regulated rail industry parties.

The case for a new regulatory scheme 
The Bus Safety Act was developed as a response to growing bus operations and the emergence of a greater safety risks and in recognition of the deficiencies of the previous regulatory scheme.

Before the BSA, bus safety in Victoria was regulated by an operator accreditation scheme in the former Public Transport Competition Act 1995 and by miscellaneous prescriptive offences in the Transport (Passenger Vehicles) Regulations 2005. Compared with best practice regimes, the previous scheme was outmoded and inadequate.

Some of the problems with the previous regime were -

 it focused almost solely on the bus operator and ignored the safety role of other key industry participants who can affect safety outcomes. In essence, the scheme ignored the bus safety chain of responsibility
 bus accreditation tends to focus on the ability to operate rather than on safety outcomes more generally
 conditions of accreditation and the passenger vehicles regulations tend to be prescriptive rather than performance-based, and do not result in the general safety awareness and proactive risk management required to develop a safety culture
 the regulator had limited sanctions available when safety breaches occurred and was often forced to choose between sanctions that were either too strong or too weak
 the scheme did not apply to all 'buses'. The previous legislative definition of 'bus' was a passenger vehicle with more than 12 seating positions, including the driver. This missed mini buses and was inconsistent, not only with the requirements in most Australian jurisdictions, but also with the relevant Australian Design Rules which regulated vehicle construction in Australia.

Parts 

The Act is divided into nine parts:

 Preliminary
 Principles of Bus Safety
 Bus Safety Duties
 Accreditation and Registration
 Alcohol and Drug Management Policy
 Review of Decisions
 Codes of Practice
 General
 Amendments to Other Acts and Repeal of Part

Coverage 
The Bus Safety Act regulates the safety compliance of most bus transport in Victoria including buses operated both commercially and non commercially. A major change made by the Act was the extension of coverage to small buses.

The former Public Transport Competition Act regime focused exclusively on large buses. The BSA extended the definition of 'bus' in line with the Australian Design Rules, which define a bus as a passenger vehicle with 10 or more seating positions including the driver. The definition refers to buses 'as built'. This means that if a vehicle is built as a bus, subsequent modifications, including reducing the number of seats, will not alter its status under the scheme.

Accordingly, a bus built with 10 seats remains a bus even if some of those seats are removed. This ensures that safety regulation is not avoided by making alterations to the vehicle. Some flexibility is provided by allowing for vehicles and services to be opted in or out of the definition.

For example, a vehicle that would otherwise be a bus, but is licensed as a taxi, is excluded so that the operator is not subject to double regulation.

Duties

Chain of responsibility 
In order to foster more proactive risk management in the bus industry, Part 3 of the BSA imposes performance-based duties of care on all industry participants who are in a position to influence the safety of the operation - what is called the 'chain of responsibility'.

Safety duties apply to all bus services, both commercial and non-commercial, and to all buses regardless of seating capacity. The primary duty holder under the Bus Safety Act is the operator of the bus service, as the person who has effective responsibility and control over the whole operation.

Safety duties are also imposed on a range of other people including -

 bus safety workers including drivers, schedulers who set bus timetables, and mechanics and testers who repair or assess vehicle safety
 procurers - that is, people who procure the bus service, known as the customer in the commercial charter sector
 people with responsibility for bus stops including people who design, build or maintain the stop and who decide on its location. This was a response to research showing that the most serious hazard associated with bus travel occurs when passengers, especially children, are crossing the road after alighting from the bus. The location and layout of a bus stop is therefore a factor in the level of risk.

All of these persons can clearly affect bus safety. They are required to ensure that, in carrying out their activities, they eliminate risks to health and safety if 'practicable' - or work to reduce those risks 'so far as is reasonably practicable'.

This familiar practicability formula is borrowed from Victoria's Rail Safety Act (and the subsequent national model Rail Safety Bill) and the Occupational Health and Safety Act 2004.

Safety culture 
Duties of this kind are a key aspect of modern safety regulation and tend to create a shared safety awareness, a proactive approach to safety management and adaptability to new circumstances - in other words, a safety culture.

The framework of safety duties in the Act seeks to give practical effect to the so-called "chain of responsibility" concept in the bus safety sector. It seeks to identify the parties who are in a sufficient position of control over risks, in this case to safety, and to allocate responsibility by law accordingly.

Penalties for a breach of safety duties are potentially high, with maximum penalties reflecting those that can be imposed on duty holders in the rail sector and in the OH and S Act. Penalties vary among natural person and body corporate offenders.

The general approach taken in the Act - to encourage a safety culture by imposing safety duties and risk management obligations on persons in a chain of responsibility - is strongly supported by the report on transport safety regulation released in October 2008 by the NSW Efficient Transportation Marketplace Working Group. The report effectively endorsed Victoria's and the nation's rail safety regime directions and suggested that a similar approach, particularly focusing on performance-based duties, be taken with all road transport.

Nature of duties 
The typical formulation of a safety duty specifies that persons covered by Part 3 of the Act must satisfy in this category is that they must "so far as is reasonably practicable, ensure the safety of the bus service".

The formulation of the duty can, however, vary according to the party covered. For example, a bus safety worker is required to take "...reasonable measures to ensure the safety of persons who may be affected by the acts or omissions of the bus safety worker."

Permissioning 
Part 4 of the Bus Safety Act contains provision for two permissioning schemes - an accreditation scheme and a registration scheme. These schemes apply according to whether the operator runs a commercial service for profit or a local bus service or a not for profit service such as those typically offered by clubs and associations.

The BSA seeks to strike a balance between the need to ensure that non commercial bus services are operated safely without requiring onerous requirements and therefore threatening the viability of  community services, such as buses provided by local councils, clubs or community organisations.

This led to the requirement in the Act for the most risky bus services - commercial services and local services - to be subject to accreditation requires while less risky not for profit services were subject to a lesser registration obligation.

Accreditation 
The key party responsible for the direct operation of commercial bus services in Victoria, the bus operator, is not permitted to operate under the Act unless granted accreditation under the BSA by the regulator.

The purpose of accreditation is to attest that a person who operates a commercial bus service or a local bus service has demonstrated the competence and capacity to manage the risks to safety associated with their bus operations.

The matters applicants are required to demonstrate under the scheme are that they have, "...and will continue to have, the competence and capacity to operate a commercial bus service or local bus service safely."

Matters relevant to satisfying that test include whether the applicant has completed an approved training course and any other matters prescribed by regulations or declared by the Safety Director.

Reduced reliance on accreditation 
In addition to safety duties, the requirement to be accredited was continued by the BSA for operators of commercial services which use medium to large buses, as well as local councils which use medium to large buses to provide a local service that is available to the general public.

The accreditation scheme under previous legislation was streamlined and strengthened by the Bus Safety Act to focus more clearly on safety. It no longer focuses on business competence, and reduced the regulatory burden by relieving accredited operators of the need to obtain periodic renewal of their accreditation.

New probity standards were also introduced by the BSA, with the inclusion of disqualification offences - essentially past criminal convictions which, depending on their seriousness, may disqualify an applicant from obtaining accreditation thereby excluding the person from operating a bus.

Additional effort required in demonstrating safety competence to the regulator, and the additional regulator vigilance involved in accreditation, are reasonably required for commercial and local services that include medium to large buses - those services that are the most visible are spending the most time on the road, carrying the largest number of passengers and usually serving the general public.

These services intrinsically have a higher safety risk. Therefore, it was important that the new accreditation scheme promotes and maintains public confidence in these services.

Significantly, the BSA makes it clear that the concept of 'commercial' includes so-called 'courtesy services' - that is, where the passenger is carried free because they have paid for a service to which the transport is ancillary - with hotel shuttles the most familiar example.

Registration 

The Bus Safety Act does not require accreditation for operators of non-commercial bus services, or services that rely exclusively on minibuses - buses with 10-12 seats. These services are, however, subject to the same range of safety duties as applies to other bus services.

They are also required by the Act to be registered with the safety regulator, enabling the regulator to take proactive compliance steps or responsive action as necessary. In addition, the specific guidance contained in codes of practice can enhance compliance by operators of these services.

Compliance 
The BSA enables the safety director to apply to the bus sector the wide array of enforcement powers and sanctions, consistent with modern safety schemes.

These provisions give the safety director regulatory tools including improvement notices (which require a duty holder to remedy a safety breach) and, in more critical circumstances, prohibition notices (which enable the safety director to prohibit the duty holder from carrying out an unsafe activity until the situation is remedied).

In each case, failure to comply with the notice is an offence. The Rail Safety Act and Road Safety Act 1986 give courts a wide range of sentencing options after a finding of guilt is made in relation to a safety offence. These, too, were made available by the BSA in relation to bus safety offences.

The compliance-related provisions to support the Bus Safety Act were not included in that Act. Instead, they were included in the Transport (Compliance and Miscellaneous) Act 1983 as part of the holistic restructuring of Victorian transport legislation driven by the Transport Legislation Review.

The compliance support scheme centres on provisions which enable the appointment of authorised officers, the conferral of coercive powers and the availability of a range of administrative and court-based sanctions.

The key elements are -
 appointment of transport safety officers
 powers relating to entry to railway premises, inspection, securing sites, use of force and seizure of things
 powers to search, enter and require production of documents and information and to require name and address details
 sanctions and penalties such as improvement notices, prohibition notices and infringement notices
 powers to initiate prosecutions, receive safety undertakings and impose commercial benefits penalty orders, supervisory intervention orders, exclusion orders and adverse publicity orders.

Responsible regulator 
The Director, Transport Safety, who operates as Transport Safety Victoria, is the responsible regulator for the application and enforcement of the Act, and the regulation of safety performance of the bus sector in Victoria. The office was created by the Transport Integration Act 2010. It commenced on 1 July 2010 and subsumed the former office of the Director, Public Transport Safety within a broader transport safety office. The Director is part of  the Department of Transport, but is functionally independent of the Department and responsible Ministers, except in limited circumstances. The Director reports to the relevant Ministers.

Development

Regulatory scheme 
The development of the proposal for the Bus Safety Act was managed by the Department of Transport in Victoria as part of its broader Transport Legislation Review project.

The Department released a discussion paper - Improving Bus Safety in Victoria - outlining the broad policy framework for a bus safety regulation scheme legislation in May 2008.

The paper outlined a series of concerns about the former bus safety regulation framework in Victoria including concerns about safety trends and outcomes and comparisons with schemes in overseas jurisdictions.

Comments on the discussion paper were requested from industry parties and other interested stakeholders.  37 comments were received on the paper. Comments received from industry, government and other stakeholders resulted in the refinement of the proposal and changes to its design.

Ultimately, the proposals for a new bus safety regulation scheme was presented to the Victorian Parliament as proposed legislation in early December 2008.

Parliamentary approval

Introduction 
The Bus Safety Act was introduced into the lower house of the Victorian Parliament, the Legislative Assembly, as the Bus Safety Bill, on 2 December 2008. The responsible Minister for the Bill proposal was the then Minister for Public Transport, the Hon Lynne Kosky MP.

The Minister moved the second reading of the Bus Safety Bill on 4 December 2008 and set the context for the Bill in her speech in support as follows -

"This Bill provides a new 'best practice' safety regulation regime for Victoria's growing bus industry. It is a major step in the modernisation of transport safety regulation that began with the Rail Safety Act 2006 and will be completed with the forthcoming review of marine safety regulation. It is also a critical component of the government's wider program of transport legislation reform, which represents the most extensive overhaul of Victoria's transport legislation in 25 years.

Foreshadowed earlier this year in the Premier's Annual Statement of Government Intentions, the introduction of this Bill is timely, as it coincides with the largest expansion of the bus network in decades and significant patronage growth on both metropolitan and regional buses.

The Bill is by no means a response to failure in the safety performance of Victoria's bus sector - the industry in fact compares well with Australian and international trends. But serious incidents, while rare, do occur. Members might recall the dreadful 1989 Kempsey bus crash when two full tourist coaches, each travelling at 100 km/h, collided head-on near Kempsey, New South Wales, claiming 35 lives and injuring 41 others. Closer to home, in July this year, 17 people were injured in a collision between a bus and a truck in Traralgon.

We must do all we can to avoid these sorts of tragedies and this Bill aims to ensure that the bus industry's good safety record in this state is maintained and improved into the future."

Debate 

The Bus Safety Bill was supported by opposition members and was the subject of minimal negative comment during its passage. The then Opposition shadow Transport Minister and the Minister for Public Transport, Terry Mulder MP, commented that -

"I know the Bill focuses very much on safety, but certainly the experience that I have had over the years working with businesses - putting in place accredited systems and business management systems - is that really at the end of the day you should make money. A business should function a hell of a lot better if it has an accreditation scheme in place.

As to this issue dealing with safety, it may well be that a company's buses are maintained at a higher level and that it does not then suffer the risk of breakdown, maintenance failures and a loss of reputation because of the failure of its equipment.

I believe accreditation has a great place in a lot of businesses and a lot of operations, providing it does one of two things: one, today you look at the safety regime, because a safety regime is very important; and two, you have to make sure you get a financial benefit out of it, because when you get a business that is being screwed or under enormous financial pressure, it tends to start to drift away from putting money into areas where it should, such as safety.

What I would say to Bus Association Victoria members is, firstly, embrace the issue of safety, and secondly, make sure your accreditation schemes provide you with the opportunity to enhance your business, improve your bottom line and become a better operation as a result of it.

As I say, the opposition will not oppose the Bill before the House. I have raised a couple of concerns that we have in relation to the Bill and trust that the Minister will pick those up."

The then Parliamentary Secretary for Public Transport, Rob Hudson MP, observed that -

"This Bill is really all about improving the safety of bus operations in Victoria.

I think we need to recognise that there is already a high level of bus safety and bus safety standards that apply to buses in Victoria, and this Bill enhances those and takes them to a new level.

Buses are playing an increasingly important role in our public transport system. For the 2008 calendar year there were nearly 98 million passengers on our buses, which is an increase of 12.9 per cent. They are experiencing the highest growth in patronage since 1949-50. We have a huge increase in bus use at the moment. With the increasing role that buses are playing in the transport network, it is important for us to ensure that we have included all buses that are out there providing commercial bus services.

The problem with the current regime is that it is prescriptive, it is limited in its scope and it is unclear. It focuses only on the operator of the bus service.

This legislation extends that to all the players in the bus sector. The part of the industry that has been regulated to date, the part that has been accredited really in many respects, is going to face a reduced regulatory burden as a result of this Bill because those companies will not be required, as they are now, to renew their accreditation every three years. Instead what they will find is their accreditation will be ongoing and will be subject to audit.

The real impact of the Bill is going to be felt mainly in the case of minibuses, which are currently completely unregulated - they are, typically, buses with 10 to 12 seats.

There are about 5500 of those buses out there, and they are going to be brought within the scope of bus safety regulation for the first time. That represents about 40 per cent of all the buses that are out there in the bus sector, so I think that is where this Bill is going to have the biggest impact, bringing those buses into the bus safety regime. They are going to do that principally, depending on whether they are a commercial bus or not, through the registration scheme."

In reply, the Minister indicated that -

"The Bill provides a new best practice safety regulation regime for Victoria's growing bus industry. ...

The introduction of this Bill is very timely because it coincides with the largest expansion of the bus network in decades and significant patronage growth on both metropolitan and regional buses.

In short, this Bill will do for the bus sector what the groundbreaking Rail Safety Act did for the rail sector - it will maintain Victoria's position as the national leader in transport policy and legislative reform."

The Minister also took the opportunity in summing up debate to thank a number of Departmental officials for their policy and stakeholder work on the Bill including Ian Shepherd and Hilary de Vries.

Passage, assent and commencement

Legislative Council debate 

The Bus Safety Bill was passed by the Legislative Assembly on 12 March 2009. The Bill was introduced into the Legislative Council on the same day and second reading was moved immediately. Debate took place in the upper house in late March 2009.

The lead speaker in the upper house debate, David Koch MLC, observed that -

"This is not a large Bill, but it is a common-sense Bill that obviously will see greater safety afforded to our public users, especially smaller volunteer groups, church groups, our elderly, our young and what have you.

This is a transport opportunity we should be supporting.  We acknowledge a possible shortcoming in relation to accreditation; that is a concern of ours, and I am sure that as time goes on it will be picked up.

In many ways the Bill mirrors the Rail Safety Act. It is important to have stand-alone Bills in our transport industry, especially given the accidents that occur. We want to have powers to investigate those on an individual basis, not only on a total transport sector basis.

It is important we have the opportunity to recognise and investigate accidents on the grounds of the individual transport mode, be it rail, bus, tramway or whatever. This Bill opens up that opportunity in terms of buses and those who choose to use buses as a mode of transport.

In closing, like Bus Association Victoria we think accreditation across the board may protect users to a greater extent in terms of driver competency, although I am not saying for a second that our volunteer drivers are not competent bus drivers. But further thought should be given at a later date to offering the opportunity for volunteer drivers to become accredited so all parts of the bus industry travel forward as one. I do not think there is one volunteer driver who would not qualify for accreditation, and it is possible that many would wish to be involved in that process.

In closing, we will be supporting the Bill; we will not be opposing the Bill. As I said, this is a good common-sense Bill, and I hope the house supports it as presented.

Lead speaker for the Greens, Colleen Hartland MLC, commented that -

"As has already been stated, the Bus Safety Bill is a sensible and long-overdue piece of legislation. The Bill promotes safety and introduces reasonable and achievable practices and procedures into the bus industry.

It contains a wide range of new provisions, overhauls the accreditation system and addresses problems in the existing system. All those things are good."

The Bus Safety Bill was passed by the Legislative Council on 31 March 2009.

Assent and commencement 
The Bus Safety Bill received the Royal Assent on 7 April 2009 to become the Bus Safety Act 2009. The Act was ultimately permitted to commence on its default commencement date of 31 December 2010.

The Bus Safety Regulations 2010 which were required to support the operation of the Act also operated from the same date thereby formally commencing Victoria's new bus safety regulation scheme.

Changes to the Act 
The Act has been subject to some significant changes since it was passed in 2009. In particular, the Bus Safety Act, like other Victorian transport statutes, was brought under the portfolio scheme in the Transport Integration Act and the high level policy and institutional framework set out in that statute.

Recent bus safety issues 
Recent activity by the independent transport safety regulator, Transport Safety Victoria, using the provisions of the Bus Safety Act and the Bus Safety Regulations 2010 has raised serious concerns about the safety of the Victorian bus fleet. Changes made by the legislation has required mandatory reporting of the results of annual bus safety inspections since February 2011. The current figures show that over a quarter of the State's buses are unsafe. Over the five-month period to July 2011, 28% of 13 plus seat buses failed their annual bus safety inspection. The head of Transport Safety Victoria, Alan Osborne, described the results as "unsettling" and called for everyone involved to shoulder their fair share of responsibility.

In September 2017, safety inspections by Transport Safety Victoria at two Transdev Melbourne bus depots found 33 defective buses. Twelve of the buses were in such poor conditions they were removed from service for urgent repairs.

See also 

 Buses in Melbourne
 Transport Integration Act
 Director, Transport Safety
 Chief Investigator, Transport Safety
 Transport Legislation Review
 Safety
 Rail transport in Victoria
 Transport Act 1983
 Transport (Compliance and Miscellaneous) Act 1983

References

External links 
 Department of Transport
 Transport Safety Victoria

Victoria (Australia) legislation
Bus transport in Victoria (Australia)
 
Bus routes
Transport in Melbourne
Transport in Victoria (Australia)
Bus Safety Act
2009 in Australian law
2000s in Victoria (Australia)
Transport legislation
History of transport in Victoria (Australia)
2009 in transport
Road safety in Australia